The France men's national under-20 basketball team is a national basketball team of France, administered by the French Federation of Basketball. It represents the country in men's international under-20 basketball competitions.

FIBA U20 European Championship participations

FIBA Under-21 World Championship participations

See also
France men's national basketball team
France men's national under-19 basketball team
France women's national under-20 basketball team

References

External links
Archived records of France team participations

Basketball in France
National youth sports teams of France
Men's national under-20 basketball teams